The Six-Day War of 1899 was fought between the British Empire and the major punti clans of the New Territories in Hong Kong on 14–19 April 1899. The British quickly and decisively ended armed resistance from the punti clans, but to prevent future resistance made concessions to placate the indigenous inhabitants. Despite losing to the better equipped British military, they achieved their ultimate goal which was to preserve their land rights, land use, and traditional customs. The special status and rights of the minority indigenous people of Hong Kong are extant to this day. The battle resulted in two wounded on the British side and about 500 dead on the Chinese side.

Background

On 9 June 1898, the British and the Qing government signed the Second Convention of Peking, granting the British a 99-year lease of the New Territories as part of Hong Kong.

Feeling abandoned by the Qing government and fearing for their traditional land rights and land use, the punti Chinese clans mobilised the clan militias which had been trained and equipped to defend against longshore raids by pirates and attempted to resist the British takeover of the territory.

Events
The war began on 14 April when the insurgents burnt down the matshed the British had prepared for a flag-raising ceremony at the Flagstaff Hill in Tai Po.

125 Indian soldiers of the Royal Hong Kong Regiment were sent to Tai Po on 15 April and were soon besieged by the villagers. They were rescued after the Royal Navy's HMS Fame shelled the insurgents' position. On 17 April, the British forces launched an attack on the insurgents in Lam Tsuen Valley and chased them up the hill. On 18 April, about 1,600 insurgents assaulted the British troops at Sheung Tsuen but were soon defeated. Further resistance was ended when British artillery was brought up against the punti walled villages, and the insurgents and villagers surrendered on 19 April. Most prominent of the villages in the resistance Kat Hing Wai, of the Tang clan, was symbolically disarmed, by having its main gates dismounted and removed.

Aftermath
After the war, Governor Henry Arthur Blake adopted an amiable co-operation policy with the villagers and it remained the official policy of the colonial government on the New Territories throughout almost the entire British rule. The British made the concession of allowing the indigenous inhabitants to retain traditional laws and customs to land inheritance, land usage and marriage, these differed from the laws made for Kowloon and Hong Kong proper and the legacy of which continues to this day.

Notes

References

Bibliography

 

1899 in Hong Kong
Conflicts in 1899
British Hong Kong
History of Hong Kong
New Territories
Six-day events
Wars involving Hong Kong
Wars involving the United Kingdom